Khamir may refer to:
Khamir, sometimes called Bandar Khamir, a city in Iran
Khamir County, an administrative subdivision of Iran
Khamir Rural District, an administrative subdivision of Iran
Khamir, Yemen, a small city in Yemen
Khamir District, an administrative subdivision of Yemen